Peabody Award winners and honorable mentions.

1960s

1960

1961

1962

1963

1964

1965

1966

1967

1968

1969

References

 List1960